The 2000 Indian Wells Masters (also known as Tennis Masters Series Indian Wells) was a tennis tournament played on outdoor hard courts. It was the 27th edition of the Indian Wells Masters, and was part of the ATP Masters Series of the 2000 ATP Tour, and of the Tier I Series of the 2000 WTA Tour. Both the men's and the women's events took place at the newly built Indian Wells Tennis Garden in Indian Wells, California, United States, from March 6 through March 20, 2000.

The men singles draw was headlined by ATP No. 1, Australian Open titlist, Masters Cup finalist, 1995 runner-up Andre Agassi, Masters Cup winner, 1995 Wimbledon champion Pete Sampras and Australian Open runner-up Yevgeny Kafelnikov. Also competing in the field were Dubai winner Nicolas Kiefer, Santiago titlist Gustavo Kuerten, Magnus Norman, Marcelo Ríos and Nicolás Lapentti.

Finals

Men's singles

 Àlex Corretja defeated  Thomas Enqvist, 6–4, 6–4, 6–3
It was Àlex Corretja's 1st title of the year, and his 10th overall. It was his 1st Masters title of the year, and his 2nd overall.

Women's singles

 Lindsay Davenport defeated  Martina Hingis 4–6, 6–4, 6–0
It was Lindsay Davenport's 2nd title of the year and her 28th overall. It was her 1st Tier I title of the year and her 5th overall. It was also her 2nd title at the event after winning in 1997.

Men's doubles

 Alex O'Brien /  Jared Palmer defeated  Paul Haarhuis /  Sandon Stolle 6–4, 7–6(7–5)

Women's doubles

 Lindsay Davenport /  Corina Morariu defeated  Anna Kournikova /  Natasha Zvereva, 6–2, 6–3

References

External links

Association of Tennis Professionals (ATP) tournament profile
Association of Tennis Professionals (ATP) Men's Singles draw
Association of Tennis Professionals (ATP) Men's Doubles draw
Women's Singles, Doubles and Qualifying Singles draws

 
Indian Wells
Indian Wells
2000
Indian Wells
Indian Wells Masters
Indian Wells Masters